Lex Frisionum, the "Law Code of the Frisians", was recorded in Latin during the reign of Charlemagne, after the year 785, when the Frankish conquest of Frisia  was completed by the final defeat of the Saxon rebel leader Widukind. The law code covered the region of the Frisians.

Content

The Frisians were divided into four legal classes, to whom the law, or those transgressions of it that incurred set fines, applied. They were the nobles, the freemen, the serfs and slaves. The clergy are not mentioned in the Lex Frisionum as they were not liable to civil law.

The Frisians received the title of freemen and were allowed to choose their own podestat or imperial governor. In the Lex Frisionum three districts of Frisia are clearly distinguished: the law governs all of Frisia, but West Frisia "between Zwin and Vlie" and East Frisia "between Lauwers and Weser" have certain stated exceptional provisions.

At the partition treaty of Verdun (843) the whole of Frisia became part of Lotharingia; at the treaty of Meersen (870) it was briefly divided between the kingdoms of the East Franks (Austrasia) and the West Franks (Neustria), but in 880 the whole country was reunited under Austrasia.

The first twenty-two chapters of the Lex Frisionum are entirely concerned with schedules of fines (compositio) and wergeld, the compensations due victims or their kin, scheduled according to the social ranks of perpetrator and victim. Remarkably, the fine for killing a woman was exactly the same as for a man of the same rank, a feature of Frisian law that links it to Anglo-Saxon law, and stands apart from all other German codes. A further eleven chapters contain the 'Additions of the Wise Men' (Additio sapientum), ten subheadings from the judgements of Wiemar and of Saxmund of whom nothing is known, as well as sections from the Lex Thuringorum ("Law Code of the Thuringians") to cover instances not previously covered.

A noble's defense was to gather a specified number of "oath-helpers" willing to swear that the crime was not committed.

The only trial by ordeal mentioned (twice) in the Lex Frisionum is the ordeal by boiling water. A stone had to be withdrawn from a seething cauldron: if the blisters were healed within three days, the man was innocent.

Transmission
On numismatic grounds based on the amounts of fines (compositio) and wergeld, the laws from the Lex Frisionum date from the first half of the 7th century at the latest.

There are no surviving manuscripts of the Lex Frisionum. The only testimony is the oldest printed version, which dates from 1557. In that year, the scholar Joannis Basilius Herold made a compilation of all Germanic laws from the time of Charlemagne, Originum ac Germanicarum Antiquitatum Libri..., printed by Heinrich Petri of Basel. Among them was printed the Lex Frisionum, but from what source, or how corrupted was Herold's text, is unknown; the title-page of his edition indicates that the material was drawn from the library (now dispersed) of the monastery of Fulda.

The surviving version is apparently a rough draft, still retaining pagan elements, which doubtless would have been edited out in the finished version, which Charlemagne apparently contemplated assembling for each of the Germanic peoples in his empire.

See also
 Early Germanic law

References

External links
Lex Frisionum Start Page: Introduction and full original Latin text, with English translation by Kees Nieuwenhuijsen
Information on the lex Frisionum and its manuscript tradition on the  website, A database on Carolingian secular law texts (Karl Ubl, Cologne University, Germany, 2012).
D.J. Henstra, The Evolution of the Money Standard in Medieval Frisia, Groningen, 2000

Germanic legal codes
8th century in Francia
History of Frisia